Nouha Dicko (born 14 May 1992) is a professional footballer who plays as a forward for Super League Greece club OFI. Born in France, he represented Mali national team at international level.

Early life
Dicko was born in Saint-Maurice, Val-de-Marne, a commune in the suburbs of Paris. He grew up in the city with his family, who originate from Mali.

Club career

Early career
Dicko began playing football at the age of six with local club Jeanne d'Arc de Maisons-Alfort. At the age of 13, he was signed by Créteil-Lusitanos, staying at the club for three seasons, before moving to Strasbourg in the spring of 2007.

Following his arrival, Dicko's progress was hindered by a number of injuries during his first season at the club, including an ankle injury that kept him out of action for four months. He made his debut for Strasbourg's reserve team in the 2009–10, impressing on a number of occasions, despite the team's relegation to CFA 2. His first-team debut came during the following season against Stade Plabennecois in a Championnat National match in September 2010.

Wigan Athletic
In 2011, Strasbourg released Dicko due to financial difficulties, and he was offered a trial with Premier League side Wigan Athletic, signing with the club a few weeks later. He made his senior debut for Wigan on 13 September 2011, in a League Cup match against Crystal Palace.

On 27 January 2012, he joined Blackpool on loan until the end of the season. He scored his first goal for the club in a 3–1 win against Doncaster Rovers, and went on to score four goals in 11 league appearances for the club. He came on as a substitute in Blackpool's 2–1 defeat in the 2012 Championship play-off final against West Ham United. He re-signed for Blackpool on a season-long loan on 17 August 2012. He was recalled from his loan on 3 January 2013.

On 28 March 2013, Dicko moved on loan again, entering his first spell with English Championship club Wolverhampton Wanderers. He made only four substitute appearances, scoring once, as the club unsuccessfully fought to avoid relegation under Dean Saunders.

Dicko began the 2013–14 season by appearing as a substitute in Wigan's Community Shield defeat to league champions Manchester United. However, new Wigan manager Owen Coyle did not select him for any league games and Dicko's only playing time for the club came in the Europa League and League Cup.

In November 2013, he was loaned out to League One club Rotherham United until January 2014. He was recalled by new Wigan manager Uwe Rösler in late December.

Wolverhampton Wanderers
On 13 January 2014, Dicko moved to Wolverhampton Wanderers, then in the third tier, for a reported fee of £300,000, signing a -year contract. Dicko scored two goals on his second debut for the club, on 25 January 2014. On 18 April, he scored a hat-trick against Rotherham United in a 6–4 victory. He ended the 2013–14 season as the club's top scorer, as they won promotion as champions.

Back at Championship level, Dicko was the club's joint top goalscorer in the following season, as the club missed out on the play-offs due to goal difference. He signed a new three-year contract with the club during the close season, and was given the squad number 9. However, in September 2015, Dicko suffered a knee ligament damage during a match against Charlton, which ultimately forced him to miss the remainder of the season.

After further delays to his comeback, Dicko returned to first-team football in October 2016, over 13 months since his last appearance and signed a new contract, which was due to keep him at Wolves until the summer of 2020. He made 32 appearances during the campaign, but scored just three times. At the start of the following season, Dicko was largely only used as a substitute by new coach Nuno Espírito Santo, but still scored twice in seven appearances; his final goal for the club came against the team he was about to join.

Hull City

On 29 August 2017, Dicko joined fellow Championship club Hull City for an undisclosed fee in a three-year deal. On 8 September 2017, he made his debut in a 5–0 loss away to Derby County. He scored his first goal for the club on 14 October 2017, when he opened the scoring in a 1–1 draw away to Norwich City. 

On 2 September 2019, Dicko joined Eredivisie club Vitesse on loan for the rest of the season.

On 30 June 2020, Hull indicated that Dicko would leave the club following the expiry of his contract.

Gaziantep
On 1 October 2020, Dicko joined Turkish Süper Lig club  Gaziantep on a two-year contract.

Yeni Malatyaspor
In January 2022, Dicko joined Yeni Malatyaspor on a 1.5 year contract with an additional 1 year option. Dicko would wear jersey 94.

OFI
In July 2022 he signed for Greek club OFI.

International career

Although born and raised in France, Dicko is eligible to play for the Mali national football team through his parents, who both come from the Yélimané Cercle area.  He was called up by Mali to their international squad in May 2014. He made his debut on 25 May 2014 in a friendly against Guinea, played in Colombes, France. In November 2014, he picked up an injury while on international duty.

Career statistics

References

External links

1992 births
Living people
People from Saint-Maurice, Val-de-Marne
Footballers from Val-de-Marne
French footballers
Citizens of Mali through descent
Malian footballers
Mali international footballers
Association football wingers
Association football forwards
RC Strasbourg Alsace players
Wigan Athletic F.C. players
Blackpool F.C. players
Wolverhampton Wanderers F.C. players
Rotherham United F.C. players
Hull City A.F.C. players
SBV Vitesse players
Championnat National players
English Football League players
Super League Greece players
French expatriate footballers
Expatriate footballers in England
Expatriate footballers in the Netherlands
French expatriate sportspeople in England
French expatriate sportspeople in the Netherlands
French sportspeople of Malian descent
Gaziantep F.K. footballers
French expatriate sportspeople in Turkey
Malian expatriate sportspeople in Turkey
Expatriate footballers in Turkey
Malian expatriates in England
Malian expatriates in the Netherlands
Süper Lig players
OFI Crete F.C. players
Malian expatriate sportspeople in Greece
French expatriate sportspeople in Greece
Malian expatriates in Greece
Expatriate footballers in Greece